Hon. George Browne ( – 22 July 1782) was an Irish  politician.

He sat in the House of Commons of Ireland from 1779 to 1782 as a Member of Parliament for Mayo.

References 
 

1735 births
Year of birth uncertain
1782 deaths
Irish MPs 1776–1783
Members of the Parliament of Ireland (pre-1801) for County Mayo constituencies